John Young was a Negro league pitcher in the 1920s.

Young made his Negro leagues debut in 1923 with the Memphis Red Sox and the St. Louis Stars. He went on to play for St. Louis again in 1924, his final professional season.

References

External links
 and Baseball-Reference Black Baseball stats and Seamheads

Place of birth missing
Place of death missing
Year of birth missing
Year of death missing
Memphis Red Sox players
St. Louis Stars (baseball) players
Baseball pitchers